The 1st National Trophy was a non-championship Formula Two motor race held at Turnberry on 23 August 1952. The race was won by Mike Hawthorn in a Connaught A Type-Lea Francis, who started from pole. John Barber and Ninian Sanderson were second and third in their Cooper T20-Bristols.

Results

References

National Trophy
National Trophy
National Trophy
National Trophy